A dog café is a type of business establishment where typically customers pay to spend time with domesticated canines for purposes of entertainment and relaxation. Such cafés may also provide other services such as food and beverages.

Dog cafés can be found in many countries, ranging from places such as New York, California, and Vietnam. At some dog cafés, the dogs are owned and provided by the businesses themselves, whereas at others, patrons bring their own dogs to socialize with other dogs.

References

Types of coffeehouses and cafés
Companies by type
Dogs in human culture